Patrick Clarence Murphy (31 August 1906 – 11 August 1973) was an Australian rules footballer who played with Hawthorn in the Victorian Football League (VFL).

Military service
Murphy later served in the Australian Army during World War II.

Death
He died at his residence in Blackburn, Victoria on 11 August 1973.

Notes

External links 

1906 births
1973 deaths
Australian rules footballers from Melbourne
Hawthorn Football Club players
Australian Army personnel of World War II
Military personnel from Melbourne
People from Malvern, Victoria